Rijuda (Bengali: ঋজুদা) is a fictional character written by Buddhadeb Guha. Rijuda is an adventure enthusiast who explores jungles with his sidekick Rudra and also with Titir and Bhotkai who are the friends of Rudra. Rudra is the narrator of these stories. The jungles that he wrote about were mainly in Eastern India. He first appeared in Rijudar Songe Jongole, published April, 1973. Rijuda, who was a former hunter, later on became a conservator. The books of Rijuda teach us a great deal of things about the forests of India and about its beauty. It also knocks some moral sense into the readers.

Stories of Rijuda

 Albino (Ananda Pub)
 Aro Dui Rijuda (Sahityam)
 Aro Dui Notun Rijuda Kahini (Sahityam)
 Saptam Ripu
 Teen Nombor
 Aro Tin Rijuda Kahini (Sahityam)
 Bagher Mangsho Ebong Onnyo Shikar (Ananda Pub)
 Bonobibir Bon e (Ananda Pub)
 Duti Rijuda Kahini (Sahityam, 2004)
 Gugunogumbarer Deshe (Ananda Pub)
 Langra Pahan (Ananda Pub)
 Moulir Raat (Ananda Pub)
 Ninikumari r Bagh (Ananda Pub)
 Rijuda Kahini (Sahityam)
 Kuruboker Deshe
 Projati Projapoti
 Jomduar
 Rijuda Samagra [1-5] (Ananda Pub, 1993)
 Rijudar Char Kahini (Sahityam, 2002)
 Rijudar Songe Jongole (Ananda Pub)
 Rijudar Songe Boxer Jongole Ebong (Ananda Pub)
 Rijudar Songe Lobongi Bone (Ananda Pub)
 Rijudar Songe Sodorbone o Anyanyo Golpo (Sahityam)
 Rijudar Songe Sufkor e (Ananda Pub)
 Ru Aha (Ananda Pub)
 Taar Baghoa (Ananda Pub)
 Tin Rijuda (Sahityam)
 Ashtam Ripu (Sharadiya Bartaman, 1427)
 Tin Rijuda (Sahityam)

References 

Fictional Indian people
Fictional Bengali people
Novel series by featured character